Ullavanjärvi  is a medium-sized lake in the Perhonjoki main catchment area. It is located in the region of Central Ostrobothnia in Finland.

See also
List of lakes in Finland

References

Lakes of Kokkola